Burkard Schliessmann is a German classical pianist and concert artist with an active international career. He attended the Frankfurt University of Music and Performing Arts and graduated with a Master's degree. He studied under several internationally recognized musical artists and participated in master classes conducted by Shura Cherkassky and Bruno Leonardo Gelber.

Career 
Schliessmann was born in Aschaffenburg. He performed at Steinway Hall in New York and is an official artist of Steinway & Sons. He has performed as a recitalist, chamber musician and orchestral soloist throughout the world and has participated in music festivals in Europe, among these the Münchner Klaviersommer, the festival “Frankfurt Feste”, the Valldemossa Chopin Festival and the Maurice Ravel Festival in Paris. He received invitations from orchestras like the Munich Philharmonic Orchestra, hr-Sinfonieorchester, WDR Radio Symphony Orchestra Cologne, Symphony Orchestra Wuppertal and the New Philharmonic Westfalia, in addition to other orchestras.

He has received honors and awards for his performances and his musical recordings and has been the subject and guest artist on many radio and television programs. His repertoire comprises Bach, Beethoven, Mozart, Schumann, Chopin, Liszt, Brahms, Scriabin, the Second Viennese School up to the Avantgarde.

Personal life 
Schliessmann is also a professional scuba diver and serves as an Ambassador for the "Protecting of Our Ocean Planet" program of the Project AWARE Foundation. The inspiration of the variety of colours of the underwater world he converts into differentiated sounds in his artistic interpretations, a phenomenon called synesthesia. In several segments of an interview with Oliver Fraenzke in The New Listener entitled "Interview: Burkard Schliessmann", Schliessmann describes his experiences of these feelings and impressions.

He also is engaged in the study of philosophy and photography.

Musical style, interpretation and artistry 
"Schliessmanns' approach to the piano, though guided by a piercing intellect, remains essentially intuitive", so a reviewer in the introduction to an interview in High Performance Review HPR, USA.

Schliessmann himself stated in a conversation about the Goldberg Variations with James Reel in 2008, 

According to Phil Muse, "Schliessmann is essentially a romantic, and as such he is the last sort of pianist you would expect to just play the notes as written, without comment."

James Harrington argued in American Record Guide in 2010 that "Schliessmann arrives at his own unique interpretations, with reverence for the past (Cortot, Michelangeli, Rubinstein, and Horszowski especially). While each phrase is impeccably shaped, there is an overall thrust to each work that holds everything together. He uses rubato sparingly, and while he embraces the virtuosity in the music, it never overrides other musical content. After a half century of listening to a number of these works, I must say that Schliessmann shed new light on most of them."

Peter J. Rabinowitz described in Fanfare in 2011 Schliessmann "as a fiercely intellectual pianist." He added: He's intellectual in two senses. First, he approaches this music with a tremendous store of background knowledge – knowledge about the composers and their works, about their early receptions, about their critical writings, about their literary inspirations, and about the cultural milieu in which they found themselves. Second, he performs the music with a rigorous sense of the ways its details contribute to its form, both in terms of its overall architecture and in terms of its vertical structure. Not that he sounds anything like Pollini, much less Rosen (to mention just two other pianists often tagged as intellectuals); his playing is far lusher and less severe than Pollini's (listen to the gorgeous shifts in color in the Barcarolle), far more flexible than Rosen's. Still, if you're looking for playing with splashy virtuosity, heightened emotionality, and an extroverted interpretive style, you won't find it here.

On playing Bach, Schumann and Chopin 
In 2008, Schliessmann said that he played Bach more than any other composer and that he had played the complete organ works at the age of 21 – and this by memory. 

In a segment of an interview with James Reel in Fanfare entitled "Burkard Schliessmann Articulates His Approach to Bach", Schliessmann speaks about the surreal and metaphysical experience of playing the Bach Goldberg Variations. According to Schliessmann, "Bach really cannot be seen, understood, and interpreted from an isolated point. Bach has to be explored as part of something complete, unique, of a universe – an aspect of human realism." This Schliessmann also stated in broadcastings on SWR, WDR and HR.

According to Schliessmann, "Chopin is the crowning and climax of piano-playing. It's something so unique, all-affecting in emotionalism, musical architecture, and structure, that all past giants are present in it: Bach and Mozart. Chopin's elegance is so singular, that again you need much experience to convey his music in the real and original style. The question of rubato is very sensitive: It's nothing arbitrary, but much more something well calculated and well proportioned, something that is integrated in the classical strength of form, which is constructed on the profound knowledge of the polyphonic and contrapuntal structures of Bach and Mozart."

In another interview with Peter J. Rabinowitz in Fanfare entitled "Cannons Camouflaged by Flowers: Burkard Schliessmann Talks about Chopin", Schliessmann stated, "To approach Chopin, you have to separate him stylistically completely from Schumann. Schumann admired Chopin very much and saw him as friend, but Chopin himself had much less interest in and esteem for Schumann. Whereas the young Schumann's creative path led in the opposite direction, from classical forms – however deeply revered, to the freedom of subjective self-expression – this is an absolute deep contrast to Chopin, who found himself favoring a classical form of musical essence. He needs to bring nothing in from outside, the music is nearly absolute."

Instruments 
In a segment of an interview in Fanfare entitled "A Philosophy, Not a Profession: The Art of Burkard Schliessmann", Peter J. Rabinowitz wrote that Schliessmann is a connoisseur of the mechanics of the piano and he insists that his concert instruments be in perfect condition. He described that according to Schliessmann the quality of the sound has its source, as well, in the quality of his piano technician, Georges Ammann.

"I don't want to be conceited," Schliessmann said, "absolutely not, but it's a fact that piano and player have to blend into one."

Peter J. Rabinowitz added that for Schliessmann "the interaction between piano and concert hall is also extremely important. He often travels with his own favored instruments (especially if there is a recording or broadcast involved), and he carefully adjusts to any hall in which he plays."

Schliessmann stated: "I need a day to hear the hall and to place the piano at the right position. This maximizes the impact on the audience."

James Inverne wrote in Steinway International Pianos Magazine that "Schliessmann owns two treasured Steinways. They were carefully selected after years of searching." One, Schliessmann said, is a "very orchestral" instrument and is used for large scale works. The other "is very sensitive and sensible, great for chamber music." He added: "The search for the ideal instruments was entirely worth it: My pianos are alive to me and a mirror of me. It was vital to get it right."

About live concerts and studio recordings 

According to Peter J. Rabinowitz, the artistic fulfilment of Schliessmann's performances is the communication with his audience. Phil Muse commented: "There is a strong personality behind his performances, one that always has a decided opinion about the music" and the FAZ described his concert appearances as a "mystic fusion".

Peter J. Rabinowitz explained, "this give and take is so important that, when recording in a studio, he likes to bring a few friends along to serve as an audience."

Schliessmann himself said: "Sometimes, I ask one, two, or more people just to sit in the audience and to listen to me with concentration as I play. It's stimulating for me, and I try to build up a situation like that in a recital with a live audience. This helps me to play in a way that electrifies people."

The interview in Fanfare entitled "Cannons Camouflaged by Flowers: Burkard Schliessmann Talks about Chopin" concluded with a statement of Schliessmann:

Definition of success and talent 

In a segment of an interview in The Cross-Eyed Pianist entitled ″Meet the Artist – Burkard Schliessmann, pianist″ Schliessmann answered the question: As a musician, what is your definition of success?

Honours and awards 

 2022: BBC Radio Scotland: ′Album of the Week′ in Classics Unwrapped, July 17 – 24. Bach: Goldberg Variations, BWV 988; released on Divine Art in July, 2022, ddc 25754. Presented by Jamie MacDougall
 2019/20: Goethe Plaque of the City of Frankfurt
 2019: International Acoustic Music Awards IAMA, USA: »Top-Finalist« Instrumental, Chopin: Scherzo No. 1 in B minor, Op. 20
 2018: Global Music Awards 2018, Gold Medal Winner, 2 Gold Medals Awards of Excellence, Schumann: Kreisleriana – Symphonic Etudes (incl. Variations Posthumes); categories: classical, Instrumental Performance – Album – Germany
 2018: Global Music Awards 2018, 3 Silver Medals for Outstanding Achievement: Bach: Keyboard Works; categories: classical, instrumental solo and album
 2017: Global Music Awards 2017, 3 Silver Medals for Outstanding Achievement: Chronological Chopin – Burkard Schliessmann; categories: classical, instrumental/instrumentalist and album
 2010: Critics' Choice, American Record Guide (Chopin-Schumann Anniversary Edition 2010; released on MSR-Classics in 2010, MS 1361)
 2008: Critics' Choice, American Record Guide (Bach: Goldberg Variations, BWV 988; released on Bayer in 2007, BR CD 100 326)
 2008: Recording of the Year, MusicWeb International (Bach: Goldberg Variations, BWV 988; released on Bayer in 2007, BR CD 100 326)
 2004: Recording of the Year, MusicWeb International (Burkard Schliessmann: Chopin; released on Bayer in 2003, BR CD 100 348)
 Melvin Jones Fellowship Award, in recognition of his international achievements in the Arts and Culture, USA, April 2013
 President's Citation, Bastyr-University, Seattle, Washington, February 2012
 Medal of Merit in Gold, from his hometown in Bavaria, Germany, January 2012
 Lions Clubs International Appreciation Award, USA, June 2010

Discography (selected) 
Schliessmann records for Arthaus Musik, MSR-Classics and Bayer. In June 2014 Schliessmann signed a further recording contract with the British label Divine Art for the worldwide releasing of selected piano works and cycles from Johann Sebastian Bach and Frédéric Chopin.

Studio albums 
Joh. Seb. Bach: Goldberg Variations, BWV 988, Divine Art, ddc 25754 (2 SACD; also available on Dolby Atmos)
Busoni, Schumann, Liszt, Scriabin, Berg: At the Heart of the Piano (Disc 1: Bach/Busoni — Chaconne in D minor, Schumann — Symphonic Etudes, Op. 13; Disc 2: Schumann — Fantasie in C major, Op. 17, Liszt — Piano Sonata in B minor; Disc 3: Scriabin — Sonata in F sharp minor, Op. 23, Études and Preludes Opp. 2 – 74, Berg — Piano Sonata, Op. 1), Divine Art, dda 21373 (3 CD)
Frédéric Chopin: Chronological Chopin — Ballades – Preludes – Scherzi and other works (Disc A: Scherzo No. 1 in B minor, Op. 20, Ballade No. 1 in G minor, Op. 23, 24 Préludes, Op. 28; Disc B: Scherzo No. 2 in B-flat minor, Op. 31, Ballade No. 2 in F major, Op. 38, Scherzo No. 3 in C-sharp minor, Op. 39, Prélude in C-sharp minor, Op. 45, Ballade No. 3 in A-flat major, Op. 47, Fantaisie in F minor, Op. 49; Disc C: Ballade No. 4 in F minor, Op. 52, Scherzo No. 4 in E major, Op. 54, Berceuse in D-flat major, Op. 57, Barcarolle in F-sharp major, Op. 60, Polonaise-Fantaisie in A-flat major, Op. 61), Divine Art, ddc 25752 (3 SACD)
Joh. Seb. Bach: Keyboard Works (Partita No. 2 in C minor, BWV 826, Italian Concerto, BWV 971, Fantasia and Fugue in A minor, BWV 904, Fantasia, Adagio (BWV 968) and Fugue in C minor, BWV 906, Chromatic Fantasia and Fugue in D minor, BWV 903), Divine Art, ddc 25751 (SACD)
Chopin – Schumann Anniversary Edition 2010, MSR-Classics, MS 1361 (2 SACD)
Bach: Goldberg Variations, BWV 988, Bayer BR 100 326 (2 SACD)
Burkard Schliessmann: Chopin (4 Ballades Opp. 23, 38, 47, 52, Fantaisie Op. 49, Barcarolle Op. 60, Polonaise-Fantaisie Op. 61), Bayer BR 100 348 (SACD)
Schumann: Kreisleriana Op. 16, Symphonic Etudes Op. 13 (incl. Variations posthumes), Bayer BR 100 311
Schumann – Liszt: Fantasie in C major Op. 17, Sonata in B minor, Bayer BR 100 293
Scriabin: Piano Works, Opp. 2 – 74, Bayer BR 100 161

Vinyl 
Chopin: piano works — Ballades – Preludes – Scherzi and other works (Vinyl A – Side 1: Ballade No. 1 in G minor, Op. 23, Fantaisie in F minor, Op. 49; Side 2: Scherzo No. 2 in B-flat minor, Op. 31, Scherzo No. 4 in E major, Op. 54; Vinyl B – Side 1: Ballade No. 3 in A-flat major, Op. 47, Prélude in C-sharp minor, Op. 45, Ballade No. 4 in F minor, Op. 52; Side 2: Barcarolle in F-sharp major, Op. 60, Polonaise-Fantaisie in A-flat major, Op. 61), Divine Art, ddl 12401 (2 LP)

DVDs 
Liszt: Piano Transcriptions of Schubert Songs and Godowsky Symphonic Metamorphoses on Waltzes and Themes of Johann Strauss, Arthaus 100 455
Arthaus DVD Sampler III (Featuring artists including Roberto Alagna, Angela Gheorghiu, Cecilia Bartoli, Bryn Terfel, Claudio Abbado, Montserrat Caballé, Burkard Schliessmann, Philip Langridge, Vesselina Kasarova, Willard White), Arthaus DVD 100 773

Television and radio productions 
Schliessmann has appeared in a number of television and radio productions on the European television stations ARD, ZDF, WDR, Bayerischer Rundfunk, Hessischer Rundfunk, ARTE, 3-SAT, EinsFestival, Classical TV and the US channels Classic Arts Showcase, WSMC, WWFM, WUOT, WDPR, KING-FM and KZSU. These include:

 KZSU: Burkard Schliessmann at Stanford University, USA: The Music Treasury celebrates Burkard Schliessmann. Presented by Gary Lemco and Lorrin M. Koran. February 6, 2022, 7–9 pm. Works from Joh. Seb. Bach, Robert Schumann, Frédéric Chopin and Alexander Scriabin.
 KING-FM: Burkard Schliessmann plays Chopin; July 27, 2020
 WDPR: Discover Classical: New at Noon, USA: Burkard Schliessmann plays Chopin; September 6, 2016
 WWFM: The Piano Matters with David Dubal, USA: Burkard Schliessmann plays Bach; March 16, 2016
 Hessian Radio in Frankfurt/Main, Germany, hr2 Doppelkopf; February 2012
 WSMC: Burkard Schliessmann "Live in University of Tennessee", Knoxville, Cleveland, USA; January 2012
SWR-Radio in Baden-Baden, Germany, Treffpunkt Klassik extra; 2008 and 2010
 WDR-Cologne, Germany, TonArt; 2008 and 2010
 ZDF: aspekte: TV-portrait of Burkard Schliessmann, 1994
 WDR: Russian salon music: Scriabin and Rachmaninoff, 1995; Production: José Montes-Baquer, Direction: Enrique Sánchez Lansch
 WDR: Liszt: Piano Transcriptions of Schubert Songs – Godowsky: Symphonic Metamorphoses on Waltzes and Themes of Johann Strauss, 1997. Production: José Montes-Baquer, Lothar Mattner, Direction: Claus Viller, Agnes Meth
 Bayerischer Rundfunk: Munich Piano Summer Festival 1993, Philharmony in Gasteig (Live recording: Bach-Busoni, Scriabin, Chopin); A Loft Production (Manfred Frei) in co-production with the BR (Korbinian Meyer). Direction: Dieter Hens
 ZDF: ZDF-Morgenmagazin: TV-portrait of Burkard Schliessmann; December 1992
 ZDF: Erstklassisch! CD presentation (Scriabin: Piano Works, Opp. 2–74'', Bayer BR 100 161); December 1990

Memberships 

Schliessmann is a member (Master Instructor) of the Professional Association of Diving Instructors (PADI) and of the Canon Professional Network. He is also a long-term member of the Frankfurter Gesellschaft für Handel, Industrie, Wissenschaft und Kultur, Lions Clubs International and American Guild of Organists.

References

External links 

Burkard Schliessmann at Divine Art Recordings Group

Year of birth missing (living people)
Living people
Bach musicians
German classical pianists
Male classical pianists
Piano pedagogues
Frankfurt University of Music and Performing Arts alumni
21st-century conductors (music)